{{Infobox Boxingmatch
|fight date    = May 7, 2011
|Fight Name    = Manny Pacquiao vs. Shane Mosley
|image         = 
|location      = MGM Grand, Paradise, Nevada, U.S.
|fighter1      = Manny Pacquiao 
|nickname1     = Pac-Man
|record1       = 52–3–2 (38 KO)
|hometown1     = Sarangani, Philippines
|height1       = 5 ft 5+1/2 in
|style1       = Southpaw
|weight1       = 145 lb
|recognition1  = WBO welterweight champion [[The Ring (magazine)|The Ring]] No. 1 ranked pound-for-pound fighter8-division world champion
|fighter2      = Shane Mosley
|nickname2     = Sugar
|record2       = 46–6–1 (39 KO)
|hometown2     = Pomona, California, U.S.
|height2       = 5 ft 8+1/2 in
|weight2       = 147 lb 
|style2 =Orthodox
|recognition2  = 3-division world champion
|titles        = WBO welterweight title
|result        =  Pacquiao wins via 12-round unanimous decision (119-108, 120-108, 120-107)
}}
Manny Pacquiao vs. Shane Mosley, was a welterweight fight for the WBO welterweight championship. The bout was held on May 7, 2011, at MGM Grand, in Las Vegas. Pacquiao won by unanimous decision and retained his WBO welterweight championship. The fight was Manny Pacquiao's first PPV fight on Showtime boxing.

National Anthem singers

Philippines (Lupang Hinirang) – Charice
United States (The Star-Spangled Banner) – Tyrese Gibson
United States (America the Beautiful) – Jamie Foxx

Entrance performers
In addition, rapper LL Cool J performed as Mosley entered the arena, while vocalist Jimi Jamison of the rock band Survivor sang "Eye of the Tiger" as Pacquiao approached the ring.

Referee and judges
The referee for the fight was Kenny Bayless, and the judges were Nevadans Duane Ford, Dave Moretti, and Glen Trowbridge. Bayless had previously been referee for fights involving Pacquiao and Mosley before, including the Floyd Mayweather vs. Shane Mosley and Manny Pacquiao vs. Miguel Cotto fights.

Promotion
Top Rank promoted the fight, which took place at the MGM Grand in Las Vegas. Pacquiao's team turned down a fight with Mosley twice a year before, but they accepted the fight after Mosley had a lopsided loss to Floyd Mayweather Jr. and a draw to Sergio Mora. A Showtime series, Fight Camp 360°'', documented Pacquiao's and Mosley's training preparations in the lead up to their bout. Shane Mosley stated that if he lost badly to Pacquiao he may retire. Pacquiao was heavily favored to win, as many fans and critics believed the 39-year-old Mosley was past his prime. Pacquiao's promoter Bob Arum stated that should Pacquiao win, it could set up a third fight with Juan Manuel Marquez in November.

Fight summary
In the third round, Pacquiao knocked Mosley down, using a one-two capped with a left straight. Mosley was left dazed by the knockdown but managed to stand up.  From that point on, Mosley backpedaled and seemed very reluctant to engage Pacquiao, throwing few combinations, trying to potshot with occasional counter right hands, and looking for one big punch. Mosley floored Pacquiao in the tenth round with a push, but referee Kenny Bayless ruled it a knockdown. None of the judges seemed to have agreed with this view, judging from the scores. Replays showed that Pacquiao was throwing a punch off balance, slipped and went down with a little help from Mosley's right hand and with his right foot trapped under Mosley's left foot. Bayless apologized for this mistake to Roach, Pacquiao's coach, after the fight. Pacquiao gained one-sided verdicts from all three judges – 119–108, 120–108 and 120–107.
Pacquiao reported that he had a cramp in his legs. Freddie Roach said that Pacquiao had problems with cramping before, but usually only in training sessions and not in the middle of bouts.

Main card
Welterweight Championship  Manny Pacquiao vs.  Shane Mosley 
Pacquiao defeated Mosley via unanimous decision (119–108, 120–108, 120–107).
Super Bantamweight Championship bout:  Jorge Arce vs.  Wilfredo Vázquez, Jr.
Arce defeated Vázquez via technical knockout at 0:55 in the twelfth round.
Super Middleweight bout:  Alfonso López III vs.  Kelly Pavlik
Pavlik defeated López via majority decision (95–95, 98–92, 99–91).
Light Welterweight bout:  Mike Alvarado vs.  Raymond Narh
Alvarado defeated Narh via technical knockout at 3:00 in the third round.

Preliminary card
Light Welterweight bout:  José Benavidez vs.  James Hope
Benavidez defeated Hope via technical knockout at 1:43 in the fifth round.
Lightweight bout:  Aris Ambríz vs.  Pier-Olivier Côté
Cote defeated Ambríz via technical knockout at 0:46 in the fourth round.
Super Flyweight bout:  Javier Gallo vs.  Rodel Mayol
Mayol defeated Gallo via majority decision (95–95, 98–92, 98–92).
Light Welterweight bout:  Karl Dargan vs.  Randy Arrellin
Dargan defeated Arrellin via unanimous decision (60–54, 60–54, 59–55).

Reported fight earnings
The fight generated 1.3 million PPV buys. These are the payouts to the fighters as reported to the executive director of the Nevada State Athletic Commission Keith Kizer. These are the official purses as per the Nevada bout agreements, It does not include sponsor money or other common forms of revenue paid through other streams. Pacquiao's official purse on the Nevada contract is six million, Top Rank has guaranteed Manny twenty million, because of PPV. According to fight promoter Bob Arum, Manny Pacquiao may earn US$30 million. Mosley's official purse on the Nevada contract is $3.95 million but he is guaranteed five million.

Manny Pacquiao $20,000,000 vs. Shane Mosley ($3,950,100)
Jorge Arce $125,000 vs. Wilfredo Vázquez, Jr. ($165,000)
Alfonso López III $40,000 vs. Kelly Pavlik ($270,000)
Mike Alvarado $50,000 vs. Raymond Narh ($22,000)

International broadcasting

References

External links
Pacquiao vs. Mosley Official Fight Card from BoxRec

Mosley
2011 in boxing
Boxing on Showtime
Boxing in Las Vegas
2011 in sports in Nevada
May 2011 sports events in the United States
MGM Grand Garden Arena